During the 2020–21 season, AGF competed in the Superliga, the top-flight of Danish football, and in this season's editions of the Danish Cup and UEFA Europa League. The season covers the period from July 2020 to 30 June 2021.

Players
As of 1 February 2021

Transfers

In

Out

Loans in

Loans out

Non-competitive friendlies

Pre-season

Mid-season

Competitions

Overview

Danish Superliga

Results by matchday

Regular season

Championship round

Matches

Regular season

Championship round

Danish Cup

UEFA Europa League

Statistics

Goalscorers

Last updated: 21 March 2021

Clean sheets

Last updated: 15 March 2021

References

Aarhus Gymnastikforening seasons
Danish football clubs 2020–21 season